Two ships of the Royal Navy have borne the name HMS St James:

  was a ship captured in 1625 and listed until 1628.
  was a  launched in 1945 and scrapped in 1961.

Royal Navy ship names